"1000 Miles Away" is a song by Australian rock group Hoodoo Gurus. It was released in May 1991 as the second single from the group's fifth studio album, Kinky. "1000 Miles Away" peaked at number 37 on the Australian singles chart.

In June 2000, Dave Faulkner said "Many people have told me '1000 Miles Away' is their favourite Gurus song and it's also among my top ten. There are references to airports and flying but I was writing about emotional distance rather than physical travel. 'I Think You Know' was another Punishment Song. We liked to keep bashing out the last two chords for a couple of minutes, Buzzcocks-style, a bit like a punk mantra. Punishment never felt so good."

The crew of Royal Australian Navy frigate HMAS Canberra had an association with the song after they adopted it as their 'anthem'. Hoodoo Gurus played a concert including the Replenishment At Sea song "1000 Miles Away" on-board during their last voyage out of Fremantle to Fleet Base West, prior to its decommissioning in 2005.

Track listing
 7" single (RCA 105212)
 "1000 Miles Away" — 4:34
 "I Think You Know" — 3:30

 CD single (CCD 026)
 "1000 Miles Away" — 4:34
 "I Think You Know" — 3:30
 "Stomp the Tumbarumba" — 3:05

Personnel
 Richard Grossman — bass, backing vocals
 Dave Faulkner — lead vocals, guitar, keyboards
 Mark Kingsmill — drums, percussion
 Brad Shepherd — guitar, backing vocals, harmonica
 Producer — Hoodoo Gurus
 Engineer — Alan Thorne
 Assistant Engineers — David Mackie, Robert Hodgson
 Mixer — Ed Stasium
 Mastering — Greg Calbi

Charts

References

1991 singles
Hoodoo Gurus songs
1991 songs
Songs written by Dave Faulkner (musician)
RCA Records singles